Tony Rome is a 1967 American neo-noir mystery crime thriller film directed by Gordon Douglas and starring Frank Sinatra in the title role, alongside Jill St. John, Sue Lyon and Gena Rowlands. It was adapted from Marvin H. Albert's novel Miami Mayhem.

The story follows the adventures of Miami private investigator Tony Rome (Sinatra) in his quest to locate a missing diamond pin that belongs to a wealthy heiress.

A sequel, Lady in Cement, was made in 1968, again featuring Sinatra as Tony Rome, and co-starring Raquel Welch and Dan Blocker. Appearing in both films was Richard Conte as Miami police lieutenant Dave Santini.

Both films are examples of a late-1960s neo-noir trend that revived and updated the hard-boiled detective and police dramas of the 1940s. Other films in this genre include The Detective (1968), which also starred Sinatra, as well as Point Blank (1967), Bullitt (1968), Madigan (1968) and Marlowe (1969).

Sinatra had originally been considered for the lead role as the tough private eye in Harper (1966), but lost out to Paul Newman.

Tony Rome, The Detective and Lady in Cement were all directed by Gordon Douglas. The three films were packaged together in a DVD box set by 20th Century Fox in 2005. Douglas also directed Sinatra in Young at Heart (1954) and Robin and the 7 Hoods (1964).

Randy Newman is co-credited on a soundtrack song.

Plot
Tony Rome is an ex-cop turned private investigator who lives on a powerboat in Miami, Florida, called ‘Straight Pass’. This is a reference to the fact that Tony also has a gambling problem. He is asked by his former partner, Ralph Turpin, to take home a young woman who had been left unconscious in a hotel room.

The woman, Diana (née Kosterman) Pines, is the daughter of rich construction magnate Rudolph Kosterman, who subsequently hires Rome to find out why his daughter is acting so irrationally.

After regaining consciousness, Diana discovers that a diamond pin that she had been wearing the night before has gone missing. Diana and her stepmother Rita hire Rome to find the lost pin.

Rome is chloroformed and beaten by a pair of thugs, and Turpin is found murdered in Rome's office. Lt. Dave Santini of the Miami police investigates the crime scene and demands information from Rome, who is an old friend.

Rome gets help from a local tramp, Ann Archer.

An attempt is made on Kosterman's life, and a jeweler is found murdered.

Rome discovers that Diana's has been selling her stepmother's jewels and giving the money to Lorna, her biological mother, but also that the pin (mailed to Rome by Turpin after trying to fence it) was a fake. Tracking down an unknown man with a gimp leg he calls Catleg, Tony determines that Rita was being blackmailed and had previously sold the real jewels to pay her ex-husband's blackmail demands.

The trail leads to Rita's dead ex-husband and Diana's stepfather, Adam Boyd, an abortion doctor stripped of his license, who ordered the killing of Kosteman, believing Diana would then inherit his entire estate (as Boyd had found documents showing Rita's current marriage was void), and that Diana would then provide generously for her mother.

The case solved, Rome invites Ann for a romantic getaway on his boat, but she decides to go back to her husband.

Cast

 Frank Sinatra as Tony Rome
 Jill St. John as Ann Archer
 Sue Lyon as Diana Pines
 Gena Rowlands as Rita Kosterman
 Simon Oakland as Rudy Kosterman
 Richard Conte as Lt. Dave Santini
 Robert J. Wilke as Turpin
 Jeffrey Lynn as Boyd
 Lloyd Bochner as Rood
 Jeanne Cooper as Lorna
 Shecky Greene as Catleg
 Rocky Graziano as Packy
Deanna Lund plays a lesbian stripper but, embarrassed by the role, she asked for her name to be removed from the credits. She also appears in the film's poster.

Production
Filming took place on location in Miami, Florida, with some scenes being shot during the day at the Fontainebleau Miami Beach, where Sinatra was performing in the evenings.
Other scenes were filmed at the Corsair Hotel at 101 South Ocean Drive, Miami Beach.

It was partially filmed on the property that novelist Douglas Fairbairn was renting at the time.

Nancy Sinatra, daughter of Frank, sang the film's eponymous title track which then appeared on her album, Nancy Sinatra, The Hit Years (Rhino Records).

Critical reception
Tony Rome was met with mixed reviews upon release. Many film critics felt that he was paying homage to his late friend Humphrey Bogart, since he was part of the original "Rat Pack" and had dated (and nearly married) Bogart's widow, Lauren Bacall. However, Sinatra created his own version of the private detective, making him a more jaunty and less dour incarnation than Bogart's famous characterizations.

Box office
According to Fox records, the film needed to earn $6,875,000 in rentals to break even, but fell short at $6,250,000.

See also
 List of American films of 1967

References

External links

 
 
 
 
 Tony Rome at Sixties Crime Films

1967 films
1960s crime thriller films
1960s mystery films
20th Century Fox films
American crime thriller films
American detective films
American mystery films
American neo-noir films
Films based on American novels
Films directed by Gordon Douglas
Films scored by Billy May
Films set in Miami
Films shot in Miami
1960s English-language films
1960s American films